Cavernas do Peruaçu Environmental Protection Area is a protected area in the state of Minas Gerais, Brazil.

Location

The area is administered by the Chico Mendes Institute for Biodiversity Conservation. It covers parts of the municipalities of Bonito de Minas, Cônego Marinho, Itacarambi and Januária in the state of Minas Gerais.

Environment

The Peruaçu River is a tributary of the São Francisco River, flowing from the tropical Cerrado region towards the semi-arid Caatinga of north east Brazil.
It runs through a deep canyon cut through a limestone massif, with many galleries and caves in the high cliffs on either side.
Rock paintings have been found throughout the area.
The river course holds gallery forests, while the massif holds some of the last areas of "dry forest" left in central Brazil.
On 16 September 1998 the area was added to the UNESCO World Heritage Site Tentative List.

Conservation

The area is classed as IUCN protected area category V, protected landscape/seascape.
The purpose is to conserve the landscape and regional culture, protect and preserve the caves and other karst formations, protect the vegetation and wildlife, manage human impact and ensure the sustainable use of natural resources.
Protected species include maned wolf (Chrysocyon brachyurus), ocelot (Leopardus pardalis mitis)
jaguar (Panthera onca) and cougar (Puma concolor capricornensis).

Notes

Sources

Environmental protection areas of Brazil
Protected areas of Minas Gerais
Cerrado